Bruce Emery Bickford (born March 12, 1957) is a retired long-distance runner from the United States. He claimed the gold medal at the 1987 Pan American Games in the Men's 10,000 metres, and represented his native country in the 1988 Summer Olympics.  He set his personal best (27:37.17) in the 10,000 metres in 1985 in Stockholm, Sweden. Bickford won a gold medal in the 1989 United States Olympic Festival Half Marathon.

Running career

High school
Bickford graduated from Lawrence High School of Fairfield, Maine where he began his climb to stardom under the direction of his late coach, David F. Martin. Bickford played basketball in his freshman year of high school, and ran cross country for the first time as a sophomore. As a high-schooler, Bickford set the state record for Maine in the indoor 2-mile, with a time of 9:09.5, which he set in 1975 at the Dartmouth Relays.

Collegiate
He then went on to Northeastern University and was elected to the Northeastern University Athletics Hall of Fame in 1991. He was also inducted into the Maine Running Hall of Fame and the Maine Sports Hall of Fame. In  1977, Bickford set and still holds one of Northeastern University's longest standing track records in the 3,000 meter steeplechase, with a time of 8:33.6.

Post-collegiate
After his undergraduate studies, Bickford's first professional affiliation was with New Balance. Later into the 1980s he also raced in the Athletics West singlet, and was coached by Bob Sevene. Bickford finished second overall in the 1986 Philadelphia Distance Run behind New Balance teammate Mark Curp, finishing the half marathon in 1:01:57. He ran the men's 10,000 meters at the 1988 Summer Olympics in Seoul, South Korea, and finished in last place among the finishers in 29:09.74, after a bout of food poisoning.

References

External links
 
 GoNU.com Hall of Fame Profile 

1957 births
Living people
American male long-distance runners
American male steeplechase runners
Athletes (track and field) at the 1988 Summer Olympics
Olympic track and field athletes of the United States
People from Benton, Maine
Northeastern Huskies men's track and field athletes
Athletes (track and field) at the 1987 Pan American Games
Saint Joseph's College of Maine people
Pan American Games gold medalists for the United States
Pan American Games medalists in athletics (track and field)
Medalists at the 1987 Pan American Games